Siberion is an extinct genus of lobopodian from the Sinsk biota of Russia. Its anatomy, including the proboscis-like organ projecting from the face and prominent grasping first pair of appendages, suggests that xenusians like this organism may have been phylogenetically related to anomalocaridids, like Anomalocaris.

References

Xenusia
Lobopodia
Cambrian genus extinctions